Hesperocimex coloradensis, the Colorado bed bug, is a species of bed bug in the family Cimicidae. It is found in Central America and North America.

References

Further reading

 

Cimicidae
Articles created by Qbugbot
Insects described in 1925